Gare Habib Bourguiba Monastir is the main railway station in Monastir, Tunisia.

Trains from the station run on the electrified, metre-gauge Sahel Railway line and serve Mahdia to the south, or Sousse, via Monastir Habib Bourguiba International Airport, to the north. Trains in both directions pass through the adjacent Faculté Monastir, a triangular junction station. Other trains serve Tunis.

References 

Railway stations in Tunisia
Railway stations opened in 1984
Monastir Governorate